Experimetrics comprises the body of econometric techniques that are customized to experimental applications.

Experimetrics refers to the application of econometrics to economics experiments.  Experimetrics refers to formal procedures used in designed investigations of economic hypotheses.

One branch of experimetrics uses experiments to evaluate the performance of econometric estimators 

In short, experimetrics is the field of study that lies at the intersection of experimental economics and econometrics.  It refers to a  broad swath of the economics literature, and encompasses both the theoretical and statistical basis of econometrics, as well as the methodology of the experimental method.

References 

 

Econometrics